Edward Charles Hovlik (August 20, 1891 – March 19, 1955) was a pitcher in Major League Baseball. He played for the Washington Senators.

References

External links

1891 births
1955 deaths
Major League Baseball pitchers
Washington Senators (1901–1960) players
Baseball players from Cleveland
Charleston Senators players
Waterbury Contenders players
Erie Sailors players
New Orleans Pelicans (baseball) players
St. Joseph Drummers players
Hutchinson Wheatshockers players
Vernon Tigers players
Wichita Jobbers players
Minneapolis Millers (baseball) players
St. Joseph Saints players
Wichita Izzies players
Beaumont Exporters players
Bloomington Bloomers players